Hannan Sarkar (born 1 December 1982) is a former Bangladeshi cricketer who played Tests and ODIs for Bangladesh. He made his Test debut aged only 19 as an opening batsman against Sri Lanka in July 2002, but he has not been selected for Bangladesh since playing against New Zealand in October 2004.

Along with Sunil Gavaskar, Sarkar is one of two Test cricketers dismissed with the first delivery of a Test match on three occasions. His record is unique in that it was West Indian bowler Pedro Collins who claimed his wicket on each occasion, the second and third in consecutive matches at the end of May and beginning of June 2004. He is also the first batsman to get out on the first delivery of a World Cup match(John Wright of New Zealand got out on first legitimate delivery of the World Cup opener in 1992 against Australia in Auckland).

External links

1982 births
Living people
Bangladeshi cricketers
Bangladesh Test cricketers
Bangladesh One Day International cricketers
Dhaka Division cricketers
Barisal Division cricketers
Rajshahi Division cricketers
Abahani Limited cricketers
Cricketers at the 2003 Cricket World Cup
Bangladeshi cricket coaches
Cricketers from Dhaka